Gledić is a village in the municipality of Kraljevo, western-central Serbia. According to the 2002 census, the village has a population of 352 people. It is home to the Gledić mountains.

References

Populated places in Raška District